Pierre Baldi (18 January 1919 – 18 June 2022) was a French painter. He studied at the École de Peinture Décorative de Tours.

References

1919 births
2022 deaths
French painters
French centenarians
Men centenarians
People from Pyrénées-Atlantiques